Enrico Colantoni (born February 14, 1963) is a Canadian actor and director, best known for portraying Elliot DiMauro in the sitcom Just Shoot Me!, Keith Mars on the television series Veronica Mars, Louis Lutz on the short-lived sitcom Hope & Gloria, crime lord Carl Elias on Person of Interest, and Sergeant Greg Parker on the television series Flashpoint. He has also had supporting roles in such films as The Wrong Guy,  Galaxy Quest, A.I. Artificial Intelligence, Contagion, and A Beautiful Day in the Neighborhood, and guest appearances on Monk, Numb3rs, Party Down, Stargate SG-1, and Bones. More recently, he starred as Allen Conner in Remedy. He played Laura Hollis's father in season three of the online web series Carmilla. He appeared in HBO's Westworld revival and in Station Eleven. Colantoni directed two episodes of the TV series iZombie.

Early life
Colantoni was born in Toronto, Ontario, the son of Gina, a garment worker, and Quintino Colantoni, a labourer and truck driver. Both his parents were immigrants from Abruzzo, Italy, and his brother, Det. Sgt. Hector Colantoni, is a retired police officer with the Toronto Police Service.

He attended the University of Toronto studying psychology and sociology, but transferred to the American Academy of Dramatic Arts in New York City.  Colantoni graduated from the Yale School of Drama, winning the Carol Dye Award.

Career

Colantoni starred in the TV series Remedy. He appeared on Just Shoot Me! as Elliot DiMauro from 1997 to 2003, and starred in the Canadian TV police drama Flashpoint as Sgt. Greg Parker (also airing in the U.S. on ION Television, and airing previously on CBS).  His older brother, who was a Toronto policeman for the past 30 years, advised Colantoni on how to play the character. Colantoni played Keith Mars for four seasons on Veronica Mars, a role he reprised in the 2014 film and the 2019 Hulu revival.

Colantoni also had a recurring role on Person of Interest as crime boss Carl Elias and on Travelers as Vincent Ingram (Traveller 001).

Philanthropy
Since 2011, Colantoni has been heavily involved with The Tema Conter Memorial Trust, an organization that assists first responders and other service personnel dealing with post-traumatic stress disorder. He became their official spokesperson and has been involved in their annual tribute gala in Toronto every year since.

He has also been involved in the Companion Animal Protection Society's campaign to boycott commercial pet stores, creating a video to raise awareness about the topic.

Personal life
On November 11, 2011, Colantoni married Rosanna Francioni.

Filmography

Films

Television

Directing

Online content

References

External links
 

1963 births
American Academy of Dramatic Arts alumni
Canadian male film actors
Canadian people of Italian descent
Canadian male television actors
Canadian male voice actors
Best Actor in a Drama Series Canadian Screen Award winners
Living people
Male actors from Toronto
University of Toronto alumni
Yale School of Drama alumni